Fornjot  or Saturn XLII is the third outermost natural satellite of Saturn (after S/2004 S 34 and S/2004 S 26). Its discovery was announced by Scott S. Sheppard, David C. Jewitt, Jan Kleyna, and Brian G. Marsden on 4 May 2005 from observations taken between 12 December 2004, and 11 March 2005. It had the largest semi-major axis among all the known moons of Saturn until the recovery of Saturn LVIII in 2019.

It is about 6 kilometres in diameter, and it orbits Saturn at an average distance of 23,609 Mm in 1491  at an inclination of 168° to the ecliptic (160° to Saturn's equator) in a retrograde direction and with an eccentricity of 0.186. It is ambiguous whether the rotation period is 6.9 or  hours, but it is known to show very little variation in brightness and is probably very round in shape. It was also the faintest moon that was measured by Cassini–Huygens.

Fornjot was named after Fornjót, a giant in Norse mythology.

References

 Institute for Astronomy Saturn Satellite Data
 Jewitt's New Satellites of Saturn page
 IAUC 8523: New Satellites of Saturn May 4, 2005 (discovery)
 MPEC 2005-J13: Twelve New Satellites of  Saturn May 3, 2005 (discovery and ephemeris)
 IAUC 8826: Satellites of Jupiter and Saturn April 5, 2007 (naming the moon)

Norse group
Moons of Saturn
Irregular satellites
Discoveries by Scott S. Sheppard
Astronomical objects discovered in 2005
Moons with a retrograde orbit